A Parisian Romance is a play written in French by Octave Feuillet and adapted in English by Augustus R. Cazauran. Producer A. M. Palmer staged it at the Union Square Theatre on Broadway, where it debuted on January 11, 1883, with Richard Mansfield starring as Baron Chevrial. Mansfield later purchased the rights to the play and made it part of the repertory of his touring company.

In 1932 Allied Pictures produced a film adaptation, also titled A Parisian Romance, directed by Chester M. Franklin. It starred Lew Cody and Marion Shilling.

References

External links
 

1883 plays
Broadway plays
West End plays
Plays adapted into films